Jourdan Kevan Tardieu DeMuynck (born September 29, 1990) is an American professional basketball player. He played college basketball for Chabot College and Prairie View A&M.

College career
DeMuynck spent three years at Chabot College. As a redshirt sophomore in 2010–11, he earned Honorable Mention All-State and first-team All-Conference honors (Coast-North Division League). He finished second in the conference with 17 points per game, while averaging seven rebounds and four assists. He shot 44 percent from the field and ranked fifth in the Coast-North Division League with 3.9 assists and led the league with 2.5 steals.

In April 2011, DeMuynck transferred to Prairie View A&M University.

As a junior at Prairie View A&M in 2011–12, DeMuynck played in 32 games with 13 starts. He began the season as a starter but emerged as a valuable sixth man off the bench once SWAC play began. He led the Panthers in scoring with 10.1 points per game and ranked third in rebounding with 4.3 boards per game. He closed the regular season out strong with a then career-high 27 points against Alcorn State on March 3, 2012.

As a senior in 2012–13, DeMuynck averaged 15.7 points, 6.5 rebounds, 1.5 assists and 1.5 steals in 32 games for the Panthers. He subsequently earned second-team All-SWAC honors and was named to the SWAC All-Tournament Team after helping the Panthers reach the SWAC Tournament Final. In the SWAC Tournament Semifinal on March 15, 2013 against Jackson State, DeMuynck scored a career-high 37 points.

Professional career
In August 2013, DeMuynck signed with Keravnos of Cyprus for the 2013–14 season. In 15 games for Keravnos, he averaged 11.7 points, 5.2 rebounds and 2.4 assists per game.

On August 22, 2014, DeMuynck signed with MZT Skopje of Macedonia for the 2014–15 season. On November 6, 2014, he parted ways with MZT after appearing in two league games and six Adriatic League games. In eight total games, he averaged 7.4 points, 4.2 rebounds and 1.8 assists per game.

On October 31, 2015, DeMuynck was selected by the Iowa Energy in the fifth round of the 2015 NBA Development League Draft. However, he was waived by the Energy six days later.

On January 10, 2016, DeMuynck signed with the Perth Redbacks for the 2016 State Basketball League season. In his debut for the Redbacks, he scored 49 points. He had nine games with 30 or more points, with three of those being 40-plus. In June 2016, he competed in the SBL All-Star Game. DeMuynck appeared in all 28 games for the Redbacks in 2016, averaging 26.5 points, 9.9 rebounds, 4.3 assists and 1.8 steals per game.

On November 17, 2016, DeMuynck signed with Union Tarbes Lourdes of the French NM1. His season was cut short after rupturing his Achilles tendon in February 2017. In 14 games for Lourdes, he averaged 13.9 points, 5.4 rebounds, 2.5 assists and 1.9 steals per game.

In November 2017, DeMuynck signed with Shahrdari Tabriz of the Iranian Super League.

In April 2019, DeMuynck joined the Perth Redbacks, returning to team for a second stint. On June 5, 2019, two days after competing in the SBL All-Star Game, he was released by the Redbacks. In eight games, he averaged 25.1 points, 6.5 rebounds and 4.4 assists per game.

In January 2020, DeMuynck moved to Saudi Arabia to play for Abha.

In June 2020, DeMuynck signed with Union Dax-Gamarde of the French NM1. He did not end up joining Dax-Gamarde due to family reasons.

Personal life
DeMuynck is French on his mother's side. He subsequently holds a French passport.

References

External links
Jourdan DeMuynck at pvpanthers.com
Jourdan DeMuynck at espn.com
Interview with Jourdan DeMuynck
Lackovic pumped for full strength 2019 Redbacks

1990 births
Living people
ABA League players
American expatriate basketball people in Australia
American expatriate basketball people in Cyprus
American expatriate basketball people in France
American expatriate basketball people in Iran
American expatriate basketball people in North Macedonia
American men's basketball players
Basketball players from California
Chabot Gladiators men's basketball players
Keravnos B.C. players
KK MZT Skopje players
People from Berkeley, California
People from San Leandro, California
Prairie View A&M Panthers basketball players
People from Castro Valley, California
Small forwards